Jessie Herron (September 11, 1900 – June 3, 1984) was an American sculptor. Her work was part of the sculpture event in the art competition at the 1932 Summer Olympics.

References

1900 births
1984 deaths
20th-century American sculptors
American women sculptors
Olympic competitors in art competitions
People from Denver
20th-century American women artists